The 2000 Speedway Grand Prix of Denmark was the fifth race of the 2000 Speedway Grand Prix season. It took place on 2 September in the Speedway Center in Vojens, Denmark

Starting positions draw 

The Speedway Grand Prix Commission nominated Danish rider Nicki Pedersen and a Jesper B. Jensen as Wild Card.

Heat details

Standings

See also 
 Speedway Grand Prix
 List of Speedway Grand Prix riders

References

External links 
 FIM-live.com
 SpeedwayWorld.tv

D
Speedway Grand Prix
2000